Mark Bell (born 19 March 1967) is an Australian former professional rugby league footballer who played in the 1980s and 1990s.

Career
A Canberra junior, with Yass and Belconnen United, Bell made his début for the Raiders from the bench in 1988, but it was to be his only appearance for the club that year. The next year, he played his first game in the starting line-up, scoring a try against Manly at Brookvale Oval.

Bell was named on the bench, without playing in the match, for both the 1989 and 1990 Grand Finals. However, he played centre in the 1991 Grand Final loss to Penrith

Bell joined the Magpies in 1992, under coach Warren Ryan. He had an immediate impact, scoring tries in his first 4 matches. He scored 16 tries throughout the year, to be the season's highest try-scorer (equal with Tim Brasher)

After an unsuccessful season with the Panthers in 1994, during which he played only 7 games, Bell joined the St George Dragons. He was with the club for 3 seasons, scoring 24 tries. He scored 4 tries in the 1996 semi-final series and played on the wing in the 1996 Grand Final loss to Manly

Bell played a final season with Wigan in 1998's Super League III. Wigan lost only one match that year, and Bell played wing in the side which won the 1998 Super League Grand Final, beating the Leeds Rhinos 10-4.

Bell still lives and works in the Canberra region. He has coached local teams Queanbeyan Kangaroos and the Yass Magpies.

References

External links
Wigan profile

1967 births
Living people
Australian rugby league coaches
Australian rugby league players
Canberra Raiders players
Penrith Panthers players
St. George Dragons players
Rugby league fullbacks
Rugby league centres
Rugby league wingers
Rugby league players from the Australian Capital Territory
Western Suburbs Magpies players
Wigan Warriors players